Evans Jonathan Ibeagha is a former Anglican bishop in Nigeria. He was the inaugural Bishop of Nike until his retirement in 2019.

He was elected in 2007 as the first Bishop of Nike.

Notes

Living people
Anglican bishops of Nike
21st-century Anglican bishops in Nigeria
Year of birth missing (living people)